John Gillespie (1836–1912) was a Scottish minister who served as Moderator of the General Assembly of the Church of Scotland in 1903.

Life
He was born in Johnstone by Lockerbie in 1836 the third son of Margaret Johnstone and her husband, James Gillespie who farmed at Annanbank, Johnstone. He was educated at Newton Wamphray. After obtaining a Masters in Divinity in Glasgow he  served the parish of Mouswald in Dumfriesshire as a minister of the Church of Scotland from 1865 to 1912. The Gillespie Memorial Hall in Mouswald is named after him.

From 1892 he served as a county councillor for Dumfriesshire representing the district of Mouswald.

A keen supporter of the local farmers he was nicknamed the "Minister for Agriculture". He was Secretary of the Galloway Cattle Society and endowed a silver cup at the Royal Highland Show for best Galloway cattle.

Family

In 1868 he married Jessie K C Patrick of Dalry, Ayrshire (b.1846). They had five daughters, Margaret J (1871), Elizabeth L C (1874). Jessie P (1877), Mary R T (1887).

Publications

The Humours of Scottish Life (1904)

References

1836 births
1912 deaths
People from Dumfries and Galloway
19th-century Ministers of the Church of Scotland
Moderators of the General Assembly of the Church of Scotland
20th-century Ministers of the Church of Scotland